Jack Luke Arbrew (4 August 1889 – 31 January 1963) was an Australian rules footballer who played with Geelong and Richmond in the Victorian Football League (VFL).

Notes

External links 
		

1889 births
1963 deaths
Australian rules footballers from Victoria (Australia)
Geelong Football Club players
Richmond Football Club players
Australian military personnel of World War I